Lindomar  is a given name. Notable people with the name include:

Lindomar Garçon (born 1969), Brazilian politician and pastor
Lindomar (footballer) (born 1977), full name Lindomar Ferreira de Oliveira, Brazilian football forward